The 2009 Copa Telmex was a tennis tournament played on outdoor clay courts. It was the 12th edition of the Copa Telmex, and was part of the International Series of the 2009 ATP Tour. It took place in Buenos Aires, Argentina, from February 16 through February 22, 2009.

The singles line up was led by world no. 10 and defending champion David Nalbandian, Nicolás Almagro and 2009 Costa do Sauípe champion Tommy Robredo. Other top seeds are Carlos Moyá, 2009 Viña del Mar finalist José Acasuso, Albert Montañés, Marcel Granollers and Eduardo Schwank.

Entrants

Seeds

Other entrants
The following players received wildcards into the main draw:

 Gastón Gaudio
 Sergio Roitman
 Juan Ignacio Chela

The following players received entry from the qualifying draw:

 Daniel Muñoz-de la Nava
 Franco Ferreiro
 Máximo González
 Pablo Cuevas

Finals

Singles

 Tommy Robredo defeated  Juan Mónaco, 7–5, 2–6, 7–6(7–5)
It was Robredo's 2nd title of the year and 9th of his career.

Doubles

 Marcel Granollers /  Alberto Martín defeated   Nicolás Almagro /  Santiago Ventura, 6–3, 5–7, [10–8]

References

External links
Official website
ATP tournament profile
Singles draw
Doubles draw
Qualifying Singles draw

 
Copa Telmex
Copa Telmex